Institutum Canarium (IC) is an academic association founded in 1969 concerned with the cultural history of the Canary Islands and the neighbouring cultures of the Mediterranean region.

The headquarters are in Vienna.

It publishes two periodicals:
 Almogaren
 IC-Nachrichten

It is a member of the International Federation of Rock Art Organizations.

Medal Dominik Wölfel 
The organisation gives out the Dominik-Wölfel-Medaille, an award named after  (1888–1963), explorer of the cultures of North Africa and the Canary Islands.

Prize winners include:
 2001 José Manuel Alamo González
 2003 Fred Olsen

References

External links 
 

International cultural organizations